Sidelnikov (masculine) or Sidelnikova (feminine), also Romanized as Sydelnykov, is a Russian surname. Notable people with the surname include:

Alexander Sidelnikov (1950–2003), Russian Soviet ice hockey player
Andrei Gennadyevich Sidelnikov (born 1980), Russian-born Kazakh footballer
Andriy Sidelnikov (born 1967), Ukrainian Soviet footballer
Anton Sidelnikov (born 1981), Russian footballer
Kirill Sidelnikov (born 1988), Russian mixed martial artist
Nikolaï Sidelnikov (1930–1992), Russian Soviet composer

Russian-language surnames